Nadezhda Ivanovna Prishchepa ( Dergatchenko, later Bezpalova, born 28 June 1956) is a Ukrainian rower who represented the Soviet Union.

References

External links
 

1956 births
Living people
Russian female rowers
Soviet female rowers
Rowers at the 1980 Summer Olympics
Olympic silver medalists for the Soviet Union
Olympic rowers of the Soviet Union
Olympic medalists in rowing
Medalists at the 1980 Summer Olympics
World Rowing Championships medalists for the Soviet Union